The 1907 Carnegie Tech Tartans football team represented the Carnegie Institute of Technology during the 1907 college football season. The head coach was Joseph H. Thompson serving his first season with the team.

Schedule

References

Carnegie Tech
Carnegie Mellon Tartans football seasons
Carnegie Tech Tartans football